Greek is an Indo-European language, the sole surviving descendant of the Hellenic sub-family. Although it split off from other Indo-European languages before 2000 BC, it is first attested in the Bronze Age as Mycenaean Greek. During the Archaic and Classical eras, Greek speakers wrote numerous texts in a variety of dialects known collectively as Ancient Greek. In the Hellenistic era, these dialects underwent dialect levelling to form Koine Greek which was used as a lingua franca throughout the eastern Roman Empire, and later grew into Medieval Greek. For much of the period of Modern Greek, the language existed in a situation of diglossia, where speakers would switch between informal varieties known as Dimotiki and a formal one known as Katharevousa. Present-day Modern Standard Greek is largely an outgrowth of Dimotiki, with some features retained from Katharevousa.

Proto-Greek 

The Proto-Greek language was the most recent common ancestor of all Greek dialects. Proto-Greek split off from its nearest Indo-European relatives some time before 2000 BC, though it is unknown whether the characteristic Greek sound-changes occurred within the Greek peninsula or if Proto-Greek speakers themselves migrated into Greece.

Mycenaean Greek
The first known script for writing Greek was the Linear B syllabary, used for the archaic Mycenaean dialect. Linear B was not deciphered until 1953. After the fall of the Mycenaean civilization during the Bronze Age collapse, there was a period of about five hundred years when writing was either not used or nothing has survived to the present day. Since early classical times, Greek has been written in the Greek alphabet.

Ancient Greek dialects

In the archaic and classical periods, there were three main dialects of the Greek language: Aeolic, Ionic, and Doric, corresponding to the three main tribes of the Greeks, the Aeolians (chiefly living in the islands of the Aegean and the west coast of Asia Minor north of Smyrna), the Ionians (mostly settled in the west coast of Asia Minor, including Smyrna and the area to the south of it), and the Dorians (primarily the Greeks of the coast of the Pelopennesus, for example, of Sparta, Crete and the southernmost parts of the west coast of Asia Minor). Homer's Iliad and Odyssey were written in a kind of literary Ionic with some loan words from the other dialects. Ionic, therefore, became the primary literary language of ancient Greece until the ascendancy of Athens in the late 5th century. Doric was standard for Greek lyric poetry, such as Pindar and the choral odes of the Greek tragedians.

Attic Greek
Attic Greek, a subdialect of Ionic, was for centuries the language of Athens. Most surviving classical Greek literature appears in Attic Greek, including the extant texts of Plato and Aristotle, which were passed down in written form from classical times.

Koine Greek

For centuries, the Greek language had existed in multiple dialects. As Greek culture under Alexander the Great (356–323 BC) and his successors spread from Asia Minor to Egypt and the border regions of India the Attic dialect became the basis of the Koiné (Κοινή; "common"). The language was also learned by the inhabitants of the regions that Alexander conquered, turning Greek into a world language.
The Greek language continued to thrive after Alexander, during the Hellenistic period (323 BC to 31 BC). During this period the Septuagint, a Greek translation of the Hebrew Bible, appeared.

For many centuries Greek was the lingua franca of the eastern half of the Roman Empire. It was during Roman times that the Greek New Testament appeared, and Koiné Greek is also called "New Testament Greek" after its most famous work of literature.

Medieval Greek

Medieval Greek, also known as Byzantine Greek, is the stage of the Greek language between the beginning of the Middle Ages around 600 and the Ottoman conquest of the city of Constantinople in 1453. The latter date marked the end of the Middle Ages in Southeast Europe. From 620 onwards, Greek was the only language of administration and government in the Byzantine Empire, due to the reforms of Heraclius. This stage of language is thus described as Byzantine Greek. The study of the Medieval Greek language and literature is a branch of Byzantine Studies, or Byzantinology, the study of the history and culture of the Byzantine Empire.

The beginning of Medieval Greek is occasionally dated back to as early as the 4th century, either to 330, when the political centre of the monarchy was moved to Constantinople, or to 395, the division of the Empire. However, this approach is rather arbitrary as it is more an assumption of political as opposed to cultural and linguistic developments. It is only after the Eastern Roman-Byzantine culture was subjected to such massive change in the 7th century that a turning point in language development can be assumed. Medieval Greek is the link between the ancient and modern forms of the language because on the one hand, its literature is still strongly influenced by Ancient Greek, while on the other hand, many linguistic features of Modern Greek were already taking shape in the spoken language.

Modern Greek

The beginning of the "modern" period of the language is often symbolically assigned to the fall of the Byzantine Empire in 1453, even though that date marks no clear linguistic boundary and many characteristic modern features of the language had already been present centuries earlier, from the 4th to the 15th century. During most of the period, the language existed in a situation of diglossia, with regional spoken dialects existing side by side with learned, archaic written forms.

After the establishment of Greece as an independent state in 1829, the Katharévusa (Καθαρεύουσα) form – Greek for "purified language" – was sanctioned as the official language of the state and the only acceptable form of Greek in Greece. The whole attempt led to a linguistic war, along with the creation of literary factions: the Dhimotikistés (Δημοτικιστές), who supported the common (Demotic) dialect, and the Lóyii (Λόγιοι), or Katharevusyáni (Καθαρευουσιάνοι), who supported the "purified dialect". Up to that point, use of Dhimotikí in state affairs was generally frowned upon. Use of the Demotic dialect in state speech and paperwork was forbidden.

The fall of the Junta of 1974 and the end of the era of Metapolítefsi 1974–1976 brought the acceptance of the Demotic dialect as both the de facto and de jure forms of the language for use by the Greek government, though the Katharevousa movement has left marks in the language.

Today, standard modern Greek, based on Demotic, is the official language of both Greece and Cyprus. Greek is spoken today by approximately 12–15 million people, mainly in Greece and Cyprus, but also by minority and immigrant communities in many other countries.

See also
History of the Latin language

Notes

References
 Geoffrey Horrocks, Greek: A History of the Language and Its Speakers (Longman Linguistics Library). Addison Wesley Publishing Company, 1997.

External links
A Brief History of the Greek Language (archived)

 

pl:Język grecki